The Battle Cruiser Fleet, (BCF), later known as Battle Cruiser Force, a naval formation of fast battlecruisers of the Royal Navy, operated from 1915 to 1919.

History
The Fleet was formed on 11 February 1915 when the Admiralty ordered the deployment of its faster Battlecruiser squadrons to the Rosyth Command and grouped them together as the new Battle Cruiser Fleet. The name 'Fleet' remained until 1916 although it was officially subordinate to the Commander-in-Chief, Grand Fleet. The fleet initially contained the 1st, 2nd and 3rd Battlecruiser Squadrons but this was reduced to the 1st and 2nd BC Squadrons in June 1916. It also included two light cruiser squadrons and two destroyer flotillas, in addition the new 5th Battle Squadron that included the new fast Queen Elizabeth-class battleships operated with the fleet. On 29 November 1916 it was renamed Battle Cruiser Force. The force was disbanded in April 1919.

Vice-Admirals commanding
Post holders included:

Chiefs of staff
Post holders included:

Components
Included

References

Sources
 Harley, Simon; Lovell, Tony. (2015) "Battle Cruiser Force - The Dreadnought Project". www.dreadnoughtproject.org. Harley and Lovell.
 Jordan, John (2011). Warships after Washington: The Development of Five Major Fleers 1922-1930. Barnsley, England: Seaforth Publishing. .
 Mace, Martin (2014). The Royal Navy and the War at Sea 1914–1919. Barnsley, England: Pen and Sword. .
 Mackie, Colin. (2018) "Royal Navy Senior Appointments" (PDF). gulabin.com. Colin Mackie.
 Smith, Gordon. (2015) "Royal Navy ship dispositions 1914–1918". www.naval-history.net. Gordon Smith.
 Trevor,, Royle, (2007). The flowers of the forest : Scotland and the First World War. Birlinn. .
 Watson, Dr Graham. (2015) "Royal Navy Organisation and Ship Deployment, Inter-War Years 1914–1918". www.naval-history.net. Gordon Smith.

External links

Fleets of the Royal Navy
1915 establishments in the United Kingdom
Military units and formations disestablished in 1919
Military units and formations established in 1915
Military units and formations of the Royal Navy in World War I